Sharon M. Pollard is an American politician who represented the Third Essex District in the Massachusetts Senate from 1977 to 1983, served as Massachusetts Secretary of Energy from 1983 to 1989, and was Mayor of Methuen, Massachusetts from 2000 to 2006.

She is married to former State Representative Tom Lussier.

References

1950 births
Women mayors of places in Massachusetts
Democratic Party Massachusetts state senators
State cabinet secretaries of Massachusetts
People from Methuen, Massachusetts
Salem State University alumni
Harvard Kennedy School alumni
Living people
21st-century American women